Prospect is a United Kingdom trade union which represents engineers, managers, scientists and other specialists in both the public and private sectors.

History
The union was formed on 1 November 2001 by the merger of the Institution of Professionals Managers and Specialists and the Engineers and Managers Association. In 2009, Prospect endorsed a transfer of engagements from the Connect union, the union for managers in the communications sector, which became a part of Prospect on 1 January 2010.

Membership
Prospect members work in engineering, communications/utilities, the civil service, museums and galleries, in a range of public and private organisations including the Met Office, Health and Safety Executive, Trinity House, Babcock and BT Group.

Skills 
With a largely professional membership, the union has placed a strong emphasis on developing skills and opportunities for career progression. To this end it launched a standalone website called Careersmart in 2014 which provides information and podcasts on a range of subjects from career appraisals and CV writing to mentoring and pensions. Careersmart followed the 2013 launch of Prospect's Apprenticeship App for mobile devices which saw 12,000 downloads in the first year. In 2015 Prospect launched a Gatsby Charitable Foundation-funded project, known as RegTech, to register workplace technicians.

References

External links
 
 Prospect career development website

Organisations based in the London Borough of Lambeth
Trade unions in the United Kingdom
2001 establishments in the United Kingdom
Trade unions established in 2001
Trade unions based in London
Trade unions affiliated with the Trades Union Congress